The following is a list of massacres that have occurred in both historic and modern day areas of Poland (numbers may be approximate):

References

Poland
Massacres

Massacres